Álvaro Gustavo González (born 12 October 1958) is an Argentine lawyer and politician, currently serving as National Deputy elected in the Federal Capital. A member of Republican Proposal, González was first elected in 2015. González was Vice President of the Chamber from 2019 to 2020.

González was member of the Buenos Aires City Legislature from 2003 to 2011.

Early life and education
González was born on 12 October 1958 in Buenos Aires, but grew up in Santa Fe. He finished high school at Colegio La Salle and studied law at the National University of the Littoral, graduating in 1984.

Political career
In 1984, González began working at the provincial Senate of Santa Fe, and later worked as an aide in the province's Ministry of Public Works, Health and Environment. From 1987 to 1989 he was a personal advisor to Governor Víctor Reviglio. Later, from 1989 to 1991, he was undersecretary of public affairs. He also served as an aide in the provincial Chamber of Deputies and in the Justice Ministry.

In the 2003 legislative election in Buenos Aires, González was elected to the City Legislature as part of the Juntos por Buenos Aires list. He was re-elected in 2007 as the 16th candidate in the Republican Proposal list.

In 2011, Chief of Government of Buenos Aires Mauricio Macri appointed González as undersecretary of public affairs, under then-cabinet chief Horacio Rodríguez Larreta. In the 2015 legislative election, González ran for a seat in the Argentine Chamber of Deputies as the fifth candidate in the Cambiemos list in Buenos Aires. The list received 45.80% of the votes, and González was elected. González was re-elected in 2019, again as the fifth candidate in the Juntos por el Cambio list.

As a national deputy, Polledo formed part of the parliamentary commissions on Accounting Oversight, Analysis of Tax Norms, Energy and Fuels, Finances, Political Trials, Mining, and Public Works. He was an opponent of the legalization of abortion in Argentina. He voted against the two Voluntary Interruption of Pregnancy bills that were debated by the Argentine Congress in 2018 and 2020.

From 2019 to 2020, he was First Vice President of the Chamber, succeeding José Luis Gioja and preceding Omar De Marchi.

References

External links
Profile on the official website of the Chamber of Deputies (in Spanish)

Living people
1958 births
Politicians from Buenos Aires
People from Santa Fe, Argentina
20th-century Argentine lawyers
Members of the Argentine Chamber of Deputies elected in Buenos Aires
Members of the Buenos Aires City Legislature
Republican Proposal politicians
20th-century Argentine politicians
21st-century Argentine politicians